Harold Evans (1928–2020) was a British journalist and editor of The Sunday Times.

Harold Evans may also refer to:

Harold Edward Dahl (1909–1956), American pilot
Harold Evans (attorney) (1886–1977), UN appointed administrator of Jerusalem in 1948
Harold Evans (cricketer) (1891–1980), English cricketer
Harold Evans (footballer) (1889–1973), former Australian rules footballer
Harold Evans, press secretary to UK Prime Minister Harold Macmillan (1957–1963); see

See also
Harry Evans (disambiguation)